Cape Bauld is a headland located at the northernmost point of Quirpon Island, an island just northeast of the Great Northern Peninsula of Newfoundland in the Canadian province of Newfoundland and Labrador.

Cape Bauld, slightly north and east of Cape Norman, delineates the eastern end of the Strait of Belle Isle.

The English explorer John Cabot may have landed at Cape Bauld on June 24, 1497, though Cape Bonavista is also mentioned as a potential landing point. Cape Bauld is only some nine kilometers (5.6 miles) northeast of the verified Viking archeological site, the L'Anse aux Meadows coastal location, dating to five centuries earlier than Cabot's date of achievement.

Lighthouse

A lighthouse was constructed at the cape in 1884. The current lighthouse is the second replacement structure, constructed 1960–1961. The lightkeeper's residence is from 1920.

See also
 List of lighthouses in Canada
Henri de Miffonis

References

External links
 Lighthouse information
 Picture of lighthouse

Headlands of Newfoundland and Labrador